Stella Nova, born Stephen Charles New (16 May 1960 – 24 May 2010), was an English guitarist and singer who performed with a number of punk rock and new wave bands in the late 1970s and early 1980s, including the Rich Kids. In the 2000s, she came out as transgender and changed her name to Stella Nova, whilst performing with the band Beastellabeast.

Early life
Born in Paddington in London, Nova received her formal education at Quintin Kynaston School in St. John's Wood, London, and started playing the guitar with the London Schools' Jazz Orchestra at the age of 14.

Pop music career
Nova first came to notice for her talented lead guitar playing style at the beginning of London's punk rock music and fashion scene in the mid-1970s. In September 1975 at the age of 15 she successfully auditioned for and rehearsed with the Sex Pistols before they became publicly known as a lead guitarist, with Steve Jones playing rhythm guitar, but she was let go after a few weeks as Jones’ lead guitar playing was rapidly improving to the point that the band no longer needed an additional lead guitarist and Nova got a day-job working in the London office of Warner Bros. Records as a junior postal clerk.

When the bass player Glen Matlock left the Sex Pistols in early 1977 he invited Nova, then only 16 years old, to join a new band that he was forming called Rich Kids as its lead guitarist. On 15 August 1978, whilst still with Rich Kids, Nova performed with a one night only line-up titled the Vicious White Kids at the Electric Ballroom in Camden Town, in what came to be seen as one of the events that marked the last hurrah of the punk rock movement's heyday in London. Whilst Rich Kids was musically gifted, it failed to find commercial success and broke up in early 1979 after the commercial failure of two of its three singles releases and first long-player release titled Ghosts of Princes in Towers (which reached No. 51 in the UK Album Chart in 1978), and Nova's career was undermined beyond this period by long-term narcotics use.

Unable to find another band to join after the Rich Kids, Nova resorted to working as a jobbing guitar for hire with a number of acts, including Public Image Ltd.

Nova rehearsed and recorded with the band Gen X in 1980, both in demo-sessions and on their long-player Kiss Me Deadly, playing the guitar track on the "Dancing with Myself" single release. The lead singer Billy Idol and bassist Tony James wanted her to be the newly re-branded band's lead guitarist, but they reluctantly decided against it due to her professional unreliability caused by her increasingly severe narcotic habit. The Gen X song "Heavens Inside" was written by Billy Idol about Nova.

After the Gen X opportunity had fallen through, Nova worked as a session musician, going on tour with Iggy Pop, on whose Soldier L.P. (1980) she played, during the recording of which Nova assaulted David Bowie who was acting as a quasi-producer of the record at the time. She also worked with Chrissie Hynde and Kim Fowley. In the early 1980s she rejected an offer to play with Duran Duran at its inception. She also recorded under the stage name of "Shooz". Having relocated to the United States in the 1980s, by the mid-1990s she was resident in Los Angeles, but failed to find musical success there, and ended up homeless, living in a car for a while before returning to England.

In 2001 she released a solo long-player entitled Here Comes Everybody.

In the early 2000s she formed a new experimental pop band entitled Beastellabeast with the young singer Beatrice Brown, whom she had become the mentor of after they met whilst both temporarily employed as guides at a publicity event for a cinema film at the Wembley Exhibition Hall in 1998, which released three self-produced LPs, viz. With Bestellabeast (2004), Beastiality (2009) and Stars & Wronguns (2010).

She worked again with Glen Matlock, whose solo album Born Running (2010) was dedicated to Nova, and featured her last recorded work.

Death
Afflicted with what would prove to be terminal cancer, Nova performed live for the last time with Beastellabeast and a reformed Rich Kids at the Islington Academy in London on 7 January 2010, at a testimonial concert organised for her family's finances. She died of cancer on 24 May 2010 at the age of 50.

A funeral service was held at the Islington & St. Pancras Cemetery in East Finchley on 11 June 2010, Glen Matlock, Tony James, Rhys Mwyn and Terry Edwards being among the pallbearers, where Nova's body was cremated.

Personal life
Nova married once, the marriage subsequently being divorced with one daughter; he also fathered a son from another relationship. In the early 2000s Nova adopted transvestism, a decision he associated with his success in breaking his 20-year-long drug habit at around the same time, and renamed himself as Stella Nova. Though he never expressed a clear preference in writing about his preferred pronouns, Nova was consistently referred to as he/him in life and in works written by friends, although he also described himself privately as having "been a tranny from day one", saying of his life before coming out, "I was completely ashamed of that fact. It was always a secret life."

References

External links
Beastellabeast on MySpace
Rich Kids – Islington Academy, Jan 2010, description and photos from the final Rich Kids concert, on Wordpress.com

1960 births
2010 deaths
People from Paddington
Deaths from cancer in England
Musicians from London
English punk rock guitarists
English new wave musicians
Sex Pistols members
Male-to-female cross-dressers
Lead guitarists
Rich Kids members